The Korean Folklore Museum is a museum in North Korea, located north of the Korean Central History Museum next to the Taedong Gate in Pyongyang. It was opened in February 1956. The museum has seven rooms comprising 1,800 square meters of space, with 2,100 exhibits.

See also 

 List of museums in North Korea

References

External links
Korean Folklore Museum at Naenara

Museums in North Korea
1956 establishments in North Korea
Museums established in 1956
Buildings and structures in Pyongyang
20th-century architecture in North Korea